Events in the year 2021 in Belgium.

Incumbents
Monarch: Philippe.
Prime Minister: Alexander De Croo.

Events
Ongoing – COVID-19 pandemic in Belgium

 4 to 5 May – DDOS attack on Belnet disrupts accessibility of websites using the .be domain, including those of the government, parliament, police, educational and research institutions, healthcare, and public broadcasters, forcing the postponement of parliamentary hearings relating to the Uyghur genocide.
 17 May to 20 June – Manhunt for Jürgen Conings, a soldier and suspected far-right extremist, goes on the run with several rocket launchers and a machine gun, leaving letters with threats against politicians, virologists and the army command. He shoots himself dead. Hundreds of police officers and soldiers combed Hoge Kempen National Park without success.
 12 June – Belgium national football team beats Russia 3–0 in their first match of UEFA Euro 2020 at Saint Petersburg Stadium. Romelu Lukaku scores two goals and Thomas Meunier one.
18 June – A school under construction collapses in Antwerp, killing 5 workers.
 14 July – Record rainfall causes beginning of 2021 European floods in Belgium, Luxembourg, the Netherlands and then Germany.
 19 to 22 September – The 2021 UCI Road World Championships is held in the Flanders region.

Deaths

 

7 January – Jan Blommaert, sociolinguist and linguistic anthropologist (born 1961).
13 January – Joël Robert, motocross racer, six-time world champion (born 1943).
22 January – Élisabeth Burdot, journalist (born 1940)
10 February – Luc Versteylen, Jesuit (born 1927)
19 February – Leopold Lippens, politician (born 1941)
12 March – Jos Van Gorp, actor (born 1939)
21 April – Henri Mouton, politician (born 1933)
20 May – Johan Weyts, politician (born 1939)
26 May – Lambert Kelchtermans, politician (born 1929)
1 June – Paula Sémer, broadcaster (born 1925)
7 June – Dixie Dansercoer, explorer and photographer (born 1962)

References

 
2020s in Belgium
Years of the 21st century in Belgium
Belgium
Belgium